William Tate (1918–1977) was an Irish international lawn bowler.

Bowls career
He won a bronze medal in the fours at the 1970 British Commonwealth Games in Edinburgh with John Higgins, Harold Stevenson and Edward Gordon. Four years later he represented Northern Ireland for a second successive Commonwealth Games in 1974.

He was also part of the fours team that just missed out on a medal at the 1972 World Outdoor Bowls Championship when a combined Ireland team finished in fourth place in the fours competition.

He won the 1963 Irish National Bowls Championships singles  and won the singles at the British Isles Bowls Championships in 1964.

References

1918 births
1977 deaths
Male lawn bowls players from Northern Ireland
Commonwealth Games bronze medallists for Northern Ireland
Commonwealth Games medallists in lawn bowls
Bowls players at the 1970 British Commonwealth Games
Bowls players at the 1974 British Commonwealth Games
Medallists at the 1970 British Commonwealth Games